The 1899 Notre Dame football team was an American football team that represented the University of Notre Dame in the 1899 college football season. In their first season with James McWeeney as coach, the team compiled a 6–3–1 record, shut out five opponents, and outscored all opponents by a total of 169 to 55.

Schedule

References

Notre Dame
Notre Dame Fighting Irish football seasons
Notre Dame football